Aubanel is a surname. Notable people with the surname include:

 Théodore Aubanel (1829–1886), French Provençal poet
 Christophe Aubanel (born 1976), French professional football player
  (1896–1978), French composer

Occitan-language surnames